The Enterprise Cup is an annual rugby union competition in Kenya, Tanzania and Uganda, though the competition frequently has the appearance of being an all-Kenyan affair as the majority of rugby clubs in the African Great Lakes region are based in this one country and frequently clubs in Tanzania and Uganda are unable to take part due to financial constraints. The only years in which the competition has not been played is between 1940–1946 due to World War II and in 1987 because an international rugby competition was held on RFUEA Ground as part of the All Africa Games.

History

Donation of the Cup to the Rugby Football Union of Kenya (RFUK)
  was launched on 23 December 1919, and commissioned on 7 April 1926. At the end of her first commission with the 4th British Cruiser Squadron on the East Indies station she was ordered home via Mauritius and the main ports of East Africa. She pulled into Kilindini Harbour ten days before the arrival of Edward, Prince of Wales and his younger brother the Duke of Gloucester on SS Malda who had arrived in British East Africa to undertake a semi-official visit to Kenya, Uganda and Tanganyika, to participate in some big-game hunting and to enjoy the infamous delights of the Happy Valley set. A launch from Enterprise ferried the royal party ashore and over the next 36 hours the senior officers were invited to participate in various functions before the departure of the two princes for Nairobi the next evening on the overnight train.

The rugby team from HMS Enterprise, composed of 30 officers and men, then departed for a two-week tour of Kenya and Uganda playing Nakuru RFC, Kitale RFC, Kampala RFC, a combined Kericho/Londiani XV, a combined Thika/Ruiru XV, and the Mombasa Sports Club. In addition, several members of this body of men participated in a boxing tournament (Royal Navy versus Kenya) in Nairobi towards the end of the tour. Harold E. Stevens, Chaplain of HMS Enterprise and tour manager, offered to the RFUK, on behalf of the ships company, a silver trophy to be awarded annually to the winners of an Inter-district Championship. Rugby Union at this time was a fiercely amateur affair and rugby in Kenya was particularly so. Consequently, the offer was firmly but politely refused. HMS Enterprise left Mombasa and sailed to Zanzibar, Dar es Salaam and Tanga, playing a total of four more matches in these three ports, thus completing the first rugby tour of all three African Great Lakes nations by a Royal Naval vessel. She turned north and steamed for home via Aden (where her rugby team beat the local RAF XV but were defeated by the South Wales Borderers) and Port Suez.

Two hours out of Aden, however, she received orders to return to pick up the Prince of Wales from Dar es Salaam and carry him to Brindisi with all possible speed. His father, the then King George V, was seriously ill; astonishingly, this is not the only time that the heir to the British throne would receive news concerning the health of the monarch whilst they were visiting Kenya, Princess Elizabeth learned that she had become queen whilst staying at Treetops on 6 February 1952.  The prince had been informed of the condition of his father while in northern Tanganyika as the guest of Baron and Baroness Blixen, Denys Finch Hatton and Alan Lascelles and had travelled to the coast on a hastily arranged express train. He boarded Enterprise on 2 December and she made a record passage of the 4,087 miles to Brindisi in eight days. The prince travelled onward to Bolougne by another special train, provided this time by the Italian government, and arrived at Buckingham Palace only nine days after leaving Dar es Salaam.

As this epic voyage was taking place, a parcel arrived at the headquarters of the Rugby Football Union of Kenya, containing a silver goblet.  The officers and men of the Enterprise had made the most of the opportunity provided by their return to the African continent and had bought, inscribed and dispatched this trophy to Nairobi.  The corinthian RFUK were thrown into turmoil, they wrote to thank the crew of Enterprise, yet still felt honour-bound to seek approval, in December 1928, from the Rugby Football Union in London and the South African Rugby Board of their plans to retain the trophy and to award it annually to the winners of an Inter-District championship. This cup has become central to rugby competition in the African Great Lakes and has been played for every year since with the exception of the war years (1940–1946) and 1987 when an international rugby competition was held on the RFUEA Ground as part of the All Africa Games.

The Annual Gymkhana
In 1929 the RFUK created a sub-committee to determine how best to go about initiating an Inter-district Championship, the problems of the distance between clubs and the poor transport links were, and still are, a major feature of rugby in the African Great Lakes region. They decided to make the most of a pre-existing Rugby Gymkhana (or Rugby Weekend), where once a year the clubs of Kenya came together to play some matches and to enjoy peripheral social and other activities. This weekend usually took place at Parklands Sports Club (the then home of Nondescripts RFC) in Nairobi which was both central and could guarantee more paying spectators than the smaller towns in the other districts. The proposed competition for 1929 failed to materialise, so the next year the RFUK agreed to subsidise the teams travel costs. As a result, the Enterprise Cup was first awarded to Nairobi district in 1930, coincidentally the year that HMS Enterprise made her second and final visit to Kenya.

The gymkhana had always been the highlight of the rugby calendar in the African Great Lakes, and the new Inter-District Championship further elevated its popularity. Two semi-finals were played on the Saturday and the final on Sunday with entertainment and dancing in the evenings. For this reason the halves were limited to 30 minutes (rather than the usual 40) in the semi-finals and 35 minutes in the final, with extra time in the event of a tie limited to 5 minutes each way. The trophy was presented to the winning captain immediately after the match.

Early competitions

As had been requested by the crew of the ship that had presented the trophy, the competition was an inter-territorial one between four teams, Nairobi District (comprising the Nairobi clubs, Thika and Ruiru), Coast District (Mombasa Sports Club), Plateau District (Kitale and Eldoret) and Rift Valley District (Nakuru, Kericho and Londiani).

Nairobi had by far the greatest population and it seems that they were able to produce much the strongest team so it seems that the Nairobi district was divided the next year as the winners were "Nairobi North" in 1931. In 1932 Nairobi was sub-divided into three zones (Muthaiga/Kabete, Parklands and Town/Hill) and players were selected based upon where they lived.  The other districts in that competition were Eldoret, Kitale, Mombasa, Ruiru and Nakuru; a total of eight.  A preliminary game was played against the nearest neighbouring district and the four semi-finalists assembled in Nairobi at the annual gymkhana. 20% of the RFUK's budget (including all gate receipts from the gymkhana) were used to subsidise the travel costs that year. Additionally, the unwieldy Inter-District Championship name had become The Enterprise Cup.

Some players in Nairobi had found difficulty in putting aside their club loyalties so in 1933 the suggestion was made that the teams from Nairobi district should, as essentially was the case in every other district, be "clubs representing districts".  A good suggestion that bore the test of time, though Nairobi was remarkably unsuccessful that year, the semi-finals on August 4 were Ruiru versus Mombasa and Eldoret versus Naivasha. The status quo was maintained with this same structure surviving until 1952, though discussion and debate continued.

The competition was stimulating rugby in British East Africa such that by 1937 there were 16 competing teams (Arusha, Dar es Salaam, Eldoret, Kakamega, Kitale, Muthaiga Country Club, Mombasa Sports Club, Naivasha, Nanyuki, Nakuru RFC, Nondescripts RFC, Nyeri, Old Cambrians, Ruiru, Tanga and Thika) and several hundred people watched the semi-finals (Eldoret v Nakuru and Nondescripts v Arusha) and the final, where Nondescripts defeated Eldoret. In 1938, the same four teams reached the semi-finals with the same results, though Eldoret prevailed over Nondescripts in the final. Nondescripts had beaten Muthaiga RFC during the Nairobi knockout stages, the latter club folded the next year.

In 1939, the Uganda Kobs RFC took part in the competition for the first time and were unlucky not to make the semi-finals, being beaten by the eventual winners, Eldoret, 8 points to 6.  The competition was suspended for the ensuing seven years due to the war, resuming in 1947.  In 1951 13 teams entered the competition; in Central Zone there was Nondescripts RFC, the Railway Club, Army, Old Cambrians and Ruiru/Thika combined, Eastern Zone consisted of Mackinnon Road, Mombasa and Northern Tanganyika (Arusha) and the Western Zone included Kitale, Eldoret, Nakuru RFC, Kericho and Uganda Kobs RFC.

In 1952 and 1953, the original district format was resurrected for two years and during this time the Enterprise Cup left the Highlands for the first time being won by Coast Province.

Coming of age
Despite this apparent leveling of the field, the competition returned to the clubs representing districts in 1954. The only difference being that West Kenya and Uganda produce a finalist between them while East Kenya, Coast and Northern Tanganyika produce the other.  This system proved successful lasting eight years until it was adjusted in 1960 such that there were four geographic zones (Uganda, West Kenya, Central Province and Coast/Tanganyika) that were each responsible for producing a semi-finalist.  A Western Zone finalist was produced by a semi-final between Uganda and West Kenya, while the Eastern Zone finalist was the winner of a match between Central Province and Coast/Tanganyika.

2015-16 Teams 
For the 2016 tournament, twelve teams have been drawn in a knock out competition. The semi-finalists from the 2015 competition have been given byes to the quarter final stage.
 Blak Blad RFC
 Homeboyz RFC
 Impala RFC
 Kabras Sugar
 Kenya Commercial Bank RFC
 Kenya Harlequin F.C.
 Mean Machine RFC
 Mwamba RFC
 Nakuru RFC
 Nondescripts RFC
 Strathmore University RFC
 Western Bulls RFC

Pre-Quarter Finals 
Blak Blad RFC v Mean Machine RFC

Nondescripts v Top Fry Nakuru

Kabras Sugar v Kenya Harlequin

Mwamba v Western Bulls

Winners of the Enterprise Cup

Notes

a.  The RFU-K was dissolved in 1953 with the formation of the Rugby Football Union of East Africa (RFUEA); the current Kenya Rugby Football Union (KRFU) was not formed until 1970.

b.  Among rich English settlers in Kenya's Happy Valley between the wars, cocaine, according to Sir Derek Erskine, was taken like snuff. While attending a dinner party with the Prince of Wales in 1928, Erskine saw another guest being physically removed from the room. When Erskine asked what had happened, he was told, "Well, there is a limit, even in Kenya, and when someone offers cocaine to the Heir to the Throne, something has to be done about it, particularly when it is between courses at the dinner table." White Mischief, book (and later film) written by James Fox.

c.  Winners for all matches 1930–2005 have been collected from The Enterprise Cup 1930–2005 (seventy five years of sporting achievement) pp. 50–51, taking into account the included errata that correct mistakes in the first publication.  Runners up and scores for these years have been elucidated from text in this book and in Rugby Football in East Africa 1909–1959. Other finalists and scores have individual citations.

d.  There appears to be an error in The Enterprise Cup 1930–2005 (seventy five years of sporting achievement) pp. 50–51. Rugby Football in East Africa 1909–1959 and Programme of Fifth Tuskers tour of Zambia 1975 list the 1931 winners as "Nairobi North", not "Nairobi".

e.  In 2009 no teams from Tanzania or Uganda have entered the competition, not because they have been excluded but due to funding problems.

f.  Awarded by default when Harlequins, Impala and Nondescripts refused to play the semi-finals without their international players.

References

Further reading
White Mischief: The Murder of Lord Erroll, James Fox, Vintage Books, 1998, 

 
Rugby union competitions in Kenya
Rugby union competitions in Uganda
Rugby union competitions in Tanzania
1929 establishments in the British Empire
Rugby union competitions in East Africa